Danielle Brulebois is a French politician representing La République En Marche! She was elected to the French National Assembly on 18 June 2017, representing the department of Jura.

See also
 2017 French legislative election

References

Year of birth missing (living people)
Living people
Deputies of the 15th National Assembly of the French Fifth Republic
La République En Marche! politicians
21st-century French women politicians
Place of birth missing (living people)
Women members of the National Assembly (France)
Deputies of the 16th National Assembly of the French Fifth Republic
Members of Parliament for Jura